Clelea formosana is a species of moth in the family Zygaenidae. It is found on Taiwan.

Adults have bright blue markings on the forewings. It is a day-flying species.

References

Moths described in 1915
Procridinae